Porter Creek South is an electoral district which returns a member (known as an MLA) to the Legislative Assembly of Yukon, Canada. It comprises part of the Whitehorse subdivision of Porter Creek and is the smallest riding in Whitehorse. It is bordered by the ridings of Porter Creek Centre, Porter Creek North, and Takhini-Kopper King.

Porter Creek South is also the former seat of Pat Duncan, 6th Premier of the Yukon, who served from 2000 to 2002. It was the only seat won by the Yukon Liberal Party in the 2002 territorial election when the Duncan's Liberal government was defeated.

It is considered a Liberal stronghold.

MLAs

Election history

2021 general election

2016 general election

|-
 
| style="width: 130px" |Liberal
|Ranj Pillai
|align="right"|337
|align="right"|46.6%
|align="right"| +6.0%

|NDP
|Shirley Chua-Tan
|align="right"|102
|align="right"|14.1%
|align="right"| -2.4%
|- bgcolor="white"
!align="left" colspan=3|Total
!align="right"|724
!align="right"|100.0%
!align="right"| –

2011 general election

|-

| Liberal
| Don Inverarity
| align="right"| 243
| align="right"| 40.6%
| align="right"| -2.8%

| NDP
| John Carney
| align="right"| 99
| align="right"| 16.5%
| align="right"| +2.6%
|- bgcolor="white"
!align="left" colspan=3|Total
! align=right| 599
! align=right| 100.0%
! align=right| –
|}

2006 general election

|-

| Liberal
| Don Inverarity
| align="right"| 304
| align="right"| 43.4%
| align="right"| -8.3%

| NDP
| Samson Hartland
| align="right"| 97
| align="right"| 13.9%
| align="right"| +3.8%
|- bgcolor="white"
!align="left" colspan=3|Total
! align=right| 700
! align=right| 100.0%
! align=right| –
|}

2002 general election

 
| style="width: 130px" |Liberal
|Pat Duncan
|align="right"|408
|align="right"|51.7%
|align="right"|-12.5%

|NDP
|Paul Warner
|align="right"|80
|align="right"|10.1%
|align="right"|-0.7%
|- bgcolor="white"
!align="left" colspan=3|Total
!align="right"|789
!align="right"|100.0%
!align="right"|–

2000 general election

|-
 
| style="width: 130px" |Liberal
|Pat Duncan
|align="right"|607
|align="right"|64.2%
|align="right"|+21.3%

|NDP
|Mark Dupuis
|align="right"|103
|align="right"|10.8%
|align="right"|-7.0%
|- bgcolor="white"
!align="left" colspan=3|Total
!align="right"|945
!align="right"|100.0%
!align="right"|–

1996 general election

|-
 
| style="width: 130px" |Liberal
|Pat Duncan
|align="right"|435
|align="right"|42.9%
|align="right"|+15.0%

|NDP
|Mark Dupuis
|align="right"|181
|align="right"|17.8%
|align="right"|-7.8%
|- bgcolor="white"
!align="left" colspan=3|Total
!align="right"|1013
!align="right"|100.0%
!align="right"|–

1992 general election

|-

| style="width: 130px" |Independent
|Alan Nordling
|align="right"|435
|align="right"|46.5%
|align="right"|–

|Liberal
|Shayne Fairman
|align="right"|261
|align="right"|27.9%
|align="right"|–

|NDP
|Brian McLaughlin
|align="right"|240
|align="right"|25.6%
|align="right"|–

|- bgcolor="white"
!align="left" colspan=3|Total
!align="right"|936
!align="right"|100.0%
!align="right"|–

References

Yukon territorial electoral districts
Politics of Whitehorse
1992 establishments in Yukon